Chan Hao-ching and Chan Yung-jan were the defending champions, but decided not to participate this year.
Shuko Aoyama and Makoto Ninomiya won the title, defeating Jocelyn Rae and Anna Smith in the final, 6–3, 6–3.

Seeds

Draw

References
Main Draw

Japan Women's Open
2016 Japan Women's Open